Vinegar Hill is an  summit of the Greenhorn Mountains in Grant County, Oregon in the United States. It is located in the North Fork John Day Wilderness of the Umatilla National Forest.

See also
List of mountain peaks of Oregon

References

Mountains of Grant County, Oregon